Herbert Neville Jones (20 January 1929 – 16 April 2020) was a Welsh professional footballer who played as an inside forward. He made one appearance in the English Football League with Wrexham in the 1951–52 season. He also played in the Welsh league for Colwyn Bay and Llandudno. He died in April 2020 at the age of 91.

References

1929 births
2020 deaths
Association football forwards
Colwyn Bay F.C. players
English Football League players
Llandudno F.C. players
Sportspeople from Mold, Flintshire
Welsh footballers
Wrexham A.F.C. players